The Taekwondo at the 1987 Southeast Asian Games was held between 17 September to 19 September at Grogol Youth Centre.

Medal summary

Men's

Women's

Medal table

References
 http://eresources.nlb.gov.sg/newspapers/Digitised/Article/straitstimes19870918-1.2.48.21.7
https://news.google.com/newspapers?nid=x8G803Bi31IC&dat=19870918&printsec=frontpage&hl=en
 http://eresources.nlb.gov.sg/newspapers/Digitised/Article/straitstimes19870920-1.2.43.11
https://news.google.com/newspapers?nid=x8G803Bi31IC&dat=19870920&printsec=frontpage&hl=en

1987 Southeast Asian Games
1987 in taekwondo